Chlorethe ingae is a species of beetle in the family Cerambycidae. It was described by Bates in 1867.

References

Compsocerini
Beetles described in 1867